is a former Japanese football player.

Playing career
Yuta Shimomura played for AC Nagano Parceiro, Japan Soccer College, Maruyasu Okazaki and FC Ryukyu from 2013 to 2015.

References

External links

1990 births
Living people
Teikyo University alumni
Association football people from Tokyo
Japanese footballers
J3 League players
Japan Football League players
AC Nagano Parceiro players
Japan Soccer College players
FC Maruyasu Okazaki players
FC Ryukyu players
Association football midfielders